The Bermuda national ball hockey team has been representing Bermuda in the Ball Hockey World Championship since 2001. Is member of the International Street and Ball Hockey Federation (ISBHF).

World Championship

External links 
http://bermudaballhockey.pointstreaksites.com/view/bermudaballhockey

Ball hockey
Men's sport in Bermuda
National sports teams of Bermuda